Daya Sepali Senadheera (?- 1988) was a Sri Lankan politician.

She was nominated by the United National Party, to fill the seat of Karandeniya, following the death of her husband, Bandulahewa in January 1982. Officially taking office on 26 March 1982. Senadheera was assassinated at her home in 1988 by the Janatha Vimukthi Peramuna (JVP) during the second JVP insurrection.

See also
List of assassinations of the Second JVP Insurrection
List of political families in Sri Lanka
Women in the Sri Lankan Parliament

References

1988 deaths
Assassinated Sri Lankan politicians
Members of the 8th Parliament of Sri Lanka
Sinhalese politicians
United National Party politicians